Viriato may refer to:

 Viriathus (died 139 BC), a leader of the Lusitanian people that resisted Roman expansion in Iberia
 Viriatos, named after Viriathus, Portuguese volunteers who fought with the Nationalists in the Spanish Civil War 1936–1939
 HD 45652 b, named Viriato, an exoplanet